Abdullah bin Bandar bin Abdulaziz Al Saud (Arabic: عبدالله بن بندر بن عبدالعزيز آل سعود) is the  Minister of National Guard (Saudi Arabia). He was appointed to the post on 27 December 2018.

Early life and education
Abdullah bin Bandar was born on 7 August 1986. He is the son of Prince Bandar bin Abdulaziz Al Saud. He received a bachelor's degree in business administration from King Saud University in Riyadh.

Career
He served as the deputy head of department of the King Salman Youth Center. He was deputy governor of Makkah region between April 2017 and December 2018. On 27 December 2018 he was named as the minister of National Guard. He replaced Khalid bin Abdulaziz bin Mohammed bin Ayyaf Al Muqrin in the post.

Personal life
Prince Abdullah is married to Karima Khalid Al Ibrahim.

References

Abdullah
1986 births
Abdullah
Abdullah
Abdullah
Living people
Abdullah